The Musketaquid Mills is a historic mill building at 131 Davidson Street in Lowell, Massachusetts.  It is the only mill building remaining on the east side of the Concord River, in the city's Belvidere section.  The four story brick building was built in stages, beginning in 1909 with the construction of six bays of three stories.  Between 1912 and 1925 it underwent two major expansions to reach its present four stories and fourteen bays.  The building was used for textile production until 1980, and was used for storage for a time.  It has been rehabilitated, and now houses Lowell's welfare services offices.

The building was listed on the National Register of Historic Places in 1999.

See also
Lowell mills
National Register of Historic Places listings in Lowell, Massachusetts

References

External links
Lowell Historic Board Musketaquid Mill

Industrial buildings and structures on the National Register of Historic Places in Massachusetts
Textile mills in Lowell, Massachusetts
National Register of Historic Places in Lowell, Massachusetts